Charlene Johnson , is a Canadian former politician in Newfoundland and Labrador, Canada. Johnson represented the district of Trinity-Bay de Verde for the Progressive Conservative Party from 2003 to 2014.

Johnson served as a minister in the cabinets of Danny Williams, Kathy Dunderdale and Tom Marshall. During her time in cabinet, she was Minister of the Environment and Conservation, Minister of Child, Youth and Family Services, Minister of Innovation, Business and Rural Development, and Minister of Finance and President of Treasury Board. Johnson is the youngest woman ever elected to the House of Assembly, and the only woman to ever give birth while serving as a Member of the House of Assembly (MHA).

Background
Johnson was born in Carbonear, Newfoundland and Labrador, and raised in the Conception Bay community of Gull Island. She studied at the University of New Brunswick, where she was awarded a Bachelor of Science degree in Forest Engineering. Johnson then obtained a Masters of Applied Science degree in Environmental Engineering from Memorial University of Newfoundland.

Politics
In the 2003 provincial election, Johnson became the youngest woman to ever be elected to the Newfoundland and Labrador House of Assembly. Johnson defeated Liberal incumbent Lloyd Snow in the district of Trinity-Bay de Verde, she won 63 percent of the vote compared to Snow's 32 percent. She was re-elected in the 2007 provincial election, taking 72 percent of the vote. Following the election, Premier Danny Williams appointed her Minister of Environment and Conservation.

In April 2009, Johnson became the first MHA in Newfoundland and Labrador, and one of only a handful of women in Canada, to give birth while being a member of a provincial or federal legislature.

Johnson served as the Environment Minister till January 2011, when Premier Kathy Dunderdale appointed her Minister of Child, Youth and Family Services. Later that year she was re-elected, winning 62 percent of the popular. Johnson remained in the portfolio of Child, Youth and Family services when Dunderdale named her new cabinet several weeks after the election. In October 2013, Johnson was appointed Minister of Innovation, Business and Rural Development. In January 2014, she was named Minister of Finance and President of Treasury Board replacing Tom Marshall who had become premier.

In September 2014, Johnson announced she was leaving politics to focus on her family. Her father, Ron Johnson ran in the byelection to replace her, but was defeated by Liberal Steve Crocker.

Post-politics
In November 2017, Johnson was appointed as CEO of the Newfoundland and Labrador Oil & Gas Industries Association (Noia).

Electoral record

|-

|-

|-

|NDP
|Sheina Lerman
|align="right"|659
|align="right"|14.16%
|align="right"|
|}

|-

|-

|-

|NDP
|Don Penney
|align="right"|257
|align="right"|5.18%
|align="right"|
|}

|-

|-

|-
 
|NDP
|Victoria Harnum
|align="right"|287
|align="right"|4.43%
|align="right"|
|}

References

External links 
 Charlene Johnson's PC Party biography
 Charlene Johnson's House of Assembly profile
 

Members of the Executive Council of Newfoundland and Labrador
Progressive Conservative Party of Newfoundland and Labrador MHAs
Living people
Women MHAs in Newfoundland and Labrador
People from Carbonear
21st-century Canadian politicians
21st-century Canadian women politicians
Women government ministers of Canada
Finance ministers of Newfoundland and Labrador
Female finance ministers
Year of birth missing (living people)